I  is the ninth letter of the Latin alphabet.

I or i may also refer to:

Language
 I (pronoun), the first-person singular subject pronoun in English
 I (Cyrillic), a letter used in almost all ancient and modern Cyrillic alphabets
 ı, dotless I, letter used in Turkish and Azerbaijani
 i, close front unrounded vowel, in the International Phonetic Alphabet
 ɨ, close central unrounded vowel, in the International Phonetic Alphabet
 ɪ, near-close near-front unrounded vowel, in the International Phonetic Alphabet
 I (kana), one of the Japanese kana that each represent one mora
 I, male prefix to some Balinese names

Science, technology, and mathematics

Biology
 Troponin I, one of the three troponins
 Haplogroup I (mtDNA), a human mitochondrial DNA (mtDNA) haplogroup
 Haplogroup I (Y-DNA), a Y-chromosomal DNA (Y-DNA) haplogroup
 Olfactory nerve, the 1st cranial nerve in human anatomy
 the Lợn Ỉ or Vietnamese Pot-bellied pig

Chemistry
 Iodine, symbol I, a chemical element
 I, isoleucine, an amino acid
 I, ionic strength in a chemical solution
 , Van 't Hoff factor

Computing
 i, a common generic index variable often used in program loops
 <i>, an HTML element for marking italic type
 .i, the common filename extension for a file that contains the output from a preprocessor
 i-, a prefix for Apple products e.g. iMac, iPod, iPhone
 i-, an Internet-related prefix used by Internet and electronic companies

Mathematics
 I, the Roman numeral for 1
 , imaginary unit, for which 
 , unit interval, which contains all real numbers from 0 to 1 inclusive
 , an index variable, e. g. in a matrix or for summation
 , the regularized incomplete beta function (of a variable  and parameters )
 , the unit vector along the x-axis in Cartesian coordinates

Physics and astronomy
  , isospin
  , luminous intensity
  , moment of inertia
  , orbital inclination
 I (Roman number one), in the Yerkes spectral classification scheme, the symbol for supergiants

Telecommunication

 I band (NATO), the range of radio frequencies from 8 GHz to 10 GHz in the electromagnetic spectrum
 I, the ITU prefix allocated to Italy in radio communication
 I, in QAM modulation schemes, the in-phase communications channel

Other uses in technology

 i, a suffix unit for video resolution (vertical Interlaced lines), as in 480i or 1080i
 I, in the YIQ colorspace commonly used with the NTSC television encoding scheme, the color-difference channel which is in-phase with the subcarrier

Arts and media

Music
 I (band), a Norwegian heavy metal band
 I, a diatonic function in tonal music theory

Albums
 i (A.R. Kane album), 1989
 I (Ben Lester album), 2019
 I (Cilvaringz album), 2007
 I (Cursed album), 2003
 I (Die Krupps album), 1992
 I (Felix Jaehn album), 2018
 I (Ikimono-gakari album), 2013
 I (Jaejoong EP), 2013
 I (JonnyX and the Groadies album), 2005
 I (Juju album), 2018
 I (Kingston Wall album), 1992
 I (Kurt Nilsen album), 2003
 i (The Magnetic Fields album), 2004
 I (Meshuggah EP), 2004
 i (Misako Odani album), 1997
 I (Nightingale album), 2000
 I (Petbrick album), 2019
 I (Sahg album), 2006
 I (Taeyeon EP), 2015
 I (Xerath album), 2009
 I (soundtrack), by A. R. Rahman from the eponymous 2015 film

Songs
 "i" (Kendrick Lamar song), a 2014 song by Kendrick Lamar from his album To Pimp a Butterfly
 "i" (Lil Skies song), a song 2019 by Lil Skies from his debut album Shelby
 "I" (Taproot song), a 2001 song by band Taproot from their album Gift
 "I (Who Have Nothing)", a 1966 Ben. E. King song also recorded by Tom Jones, who used the title for one of his albums
 "I", a 2003 song on Weather Systems, an album by Andrew Bird
 "I", a 1992 song on Selected Ambient Works 85–92, an album by Aphex Twin
 "I", a 1992 song on Dehumanizer, an album by Black Sabbath
 "I", a 1997 song on Coal Chamber, an album by Coal Chamber
 "I", a 1967 song on Underground, an album by The Electric Prunes
 "I", a 2012 song on Muse, an album by Jolin Tsai
 "I", a 1981 song on Music from "The Elder", an album by Kiss
 "I", a 1994 song on Made in USA, an album by Pizzicato Five
 "I", a 1999 song on Eternal, an album by Samael
 "I", a 2003 song on Winter Story, an album by Shinhwa
 "I", a 2011 song on Cinderella's Eyes, an album by Nicola Roberts
 "I", a 2015 song on I, an EP by Taeyeon
 "I", a 2016 song by Rezz
 "I", a 2019 song by Hey! Say! JUMP

Other media
 I (2015 film), an Indian Tamil-language film
 I (2016 film), an Iranian film
 i (TV network), the former name of ION Television
 i (newspaper), a British newspaper based in London
 i (Portuguese newspaper), a Portuguese newspaper based in Lisbon
 I, a character in the comic book series Adventure into Fear
 "I" Is for Innocent, the ninth novel in Sue Grafton's "Alphabet mystery" series, published in 1992
 I, a Man, a 1967 Andy Warhol film

Mythology
 Goddess I, a Mayan deity
 Hou-i, or I, a heroic archer and hunter in Chinese mythology

Vehicles
 Italy (I), in the list of international vehicle registration codes
 Italy (aircraft registration prefix)
 Mitsubishi i, a Japanese kei car

Other uses
 i, an international symbol for visitor or tourist information; see ISO 7001
 Nintendo DSi, the third model in the Nintendo DS line, released in 2008
 Nintendo DSi XL, the larger version of the DSi, released in 2009
 I, an alternative romanization of Lee (Korean surname)
 I-Foundation, a charity in charge of state-funded Hindu faith schools in the United Kingdom
 Interest rate (i), in economics
 Investment (I), in economics
 India, the military time zone code for UTC+09:00

See also

 1 (disambiguation)
 l (disambiguation)
 Eye (disambiguation)
 Self